Threshold is a 1990 science fiction novel by American writers Chris Morris and Janet Morris. It is the first book of its namesake trilogy.

Plot summary
In a futuristic world, Earth is now a preserve.  A captain is transported 500 years into the future and onto Threshold, which is a space habitat.  Here he meets with the daughter of a Muslim leader, one of many who are being kept from their travel to Mecca.

References

1990 American novels
1990 science fiction novels
Novels by Janet Morris